Prince Lestat and the Realms of Atlantis is a horror novel by American writer  Anne Rice, the twelfth in The Vampire Chronicles series, published on November 29, 2016. It is written as both a first-person and third-person narrative.

Plot summary 
"In my dreams, I saw a city fall into the sea. I heard the cries of thousands", writes Rice, as Lestat de Lioncourt sees visions of a ruined city in his sleep.  He and Amel, a spirit Lestat bonded with in the events of the preceding novel, search for the meaning behind the visions of Atlantis, and what it means to the vampires of the world.

The novel presents a lengthy procession of Blood Drinkers from previous adventures as they form a united front against a possible adversary in the form of replimoid beings created many millennia ago for one specific purpose: the destruction of Atlantis and its all-powerful ruler – Amel.

References

External links
 
 "Anne Rice Just Changed Everything You Thought You Knew About Vampires" – io9

2016 American novels
Novels by Anne Rice
The Vampire Chronicles novels
American horror novels
Alfred A. Knopf books